North Eastern Railway Class T3, classified Q7 by the LNER is a class of 0-8-0 steam locomotive designed for heavy freight.  Five were built by the NER in 1919 and a further 10 by the London and North Eastern Railway (LNER) in 1924.

Performance
The first of the T3s, No.901 was outshopped from Darlington Works in November 1919. A month later the NER organised a test train, over the Newcastle to Carlisle line, including a brake van and the company's dynamometer car to record the locomotive's performance. No.901 had  in tow but handled the load with ease, registering both high power and steady acceleration.

LNER
Despite their prowess, the original quintet of T3s was not augmented by the North Eastern Railway, a move that would have pleased footplate crews who disliked having to lubricate and maintain the centre cylinder and valve gear. Instead the enlargement of the class came under LNER. it authorised the construction of ten additional T3s and these emerged from Darlington Works during 1924.

Of the new engines two were allocated to York and a further four went to Hull. The remaining four gravitated to their natural habitat, Tyne Dock depot near South Shields. It was there eventually that all 15 T3s/Q7s congregated. Here they performed the role they were designed for. On the steepest section, as severe as 1 in 35 (2.86%) in places, one 0-8-0 pulled while another pushed.

British Railways
All 15 passed into British Railways ownership in 1948 and they were numbered 63460-63474.  They remained master of their task till the arrival of BR Standard Class 9F 2-10-0s in the 1950s. With the loss of their bread and butter work British Railways retired all 15 of the Q7s in November and December 1962.

Preservation
One, NER 901 (BR 63460) has survived and is currently on display at Darlington Railway Centre and Museum. It is the newest exhibit at the museum.

References

External links 

 The Raven Q7 (NER Class T3) 0-8-0 Locomotives LNER Encyclopedia

T3
0-8-0 locomotives
Railway locomotives introduced in 1919
Standard gauge steam locomotives of Great Britain
Freight locomotives